"P.D.A. (We Just Don't Care)" is a song by American singer John Legend, taken from his second studio album, Once Again (2006). It was written by Legend, Jessyca Wilson, Eric Hudson, and Kawan Prather, with production overseen by Hudson and Jack Splash. Craig Street and Legend as credited as co-producers on the song. An acronym for public display of affection, "P.D.A. (We Just Don't Care)" was released in early 2007 as the album's third single.

The song became a success in the Netherlands where it reached number 20 on both the Dutch Top 40 and the Single Top 100. An accompanying music video for the song, which was shot in Rio de Janeiro, Brazil by Australian director Nabil Elderkin, premiered on Yahoo! Music on January 29. 2007. Brazilian actor Alexandre Rodrigues appears on the music video. "P.D.A. (We Just Don't Care)" was later included on the international soundtrack of the Brazilian soap opera Paraíso Tropical, produced by Rede Globo.

Track listings

Notes
 signifies a co-producer
 signifies an additional producer

Personnel
Credits adapted from the liner notes of Once Again.

Produced by Eric Hudson and Jack Splash
Co-produced by Craig Street and John Legend
Recorded by Tatsuya Sato at Sony Music Studios, S. Husky Hoskulds (assisted by Bill Mims) at Sunset Sound Factory and Hector Castillo at Sear Sound, NYC and Right Track
Mixed by Tony Maserati (assisted by Andy Marcinkowski) at Chung King Studios
Vocals: John Legend
Background vocals: Jessyca Wilson and Sasha Allen
Piano: Eric Hudson
Bass guitar: Eric Hudson and David Piltch
Drum programming: Jack Splash
Live drums: Earl Harvin
Guitar: Doyle Bramhall, Chris Bruce and David Torn
Keyboards: Patrick Warren, Jamie Muhoberac and Didi Gutman
Horns by Jerry Freeman, Jason Freeman, Richard Owens and Kebbi Williams
String arrangement: Daniele Luppi
Trombone: Art Baron
Violins: Sandra Park, Sharon Yamada, Wen Qian, Caterina Szepez, Kuan Lu, Jung Sun Yoo, Lisa Kim, Soo Hyun Kwon, Sarah O'Boyle, Mateuz Wolski, Katherine Fong and Krystof Kuznik

Charts

Weekly charts

Year-end charts

References

2007 singles
2006 songs
GOOD Music singles
John Legend songs
Music videos directed by Nabil Elderkin
Songs written by Eric Hudson
Songs written by John Legend
Songs written by Kawan Prather